Fuscicupes is an extinct genus of beetle. It contains only one species, Fuscicupes parvus. It was included in the family Ommatidae by some authors, but was excluded by Kirejtshuk (2020}. It is known from the Aptian aged Laiyang Formation, China.

References

Ommatidae
Monotypic Archostemata genera
Prehistoric beetle genera